Aberdeen was a burgh constituency that elected one commissioner to the Parliament of Scotland and to the Convention of Estates.

After the Acts of Union 1707, Aberdeen, Arbroath, Brechin, Inverbervie and Montrose formed the Aberdeen district of burghs, returning one member between them to the House of Commons of Great Britain.

List of burgh commissioners

 1661–62: William Gray, provost (died 1662) 
 1663: Gilbert Gray of Saphok  
 1665 (convention),1669–74: Sir Robert Patrie of Portlethine, provost
 1667 (convention): Alexander Alexander, bailie 
 1681–82, 1685–86: Sir George Skene of Fintray, provost 
 1689 (convention), 1689–90: Alexander Gordon, provost (died c.1690) 
 1693: Walter Cochrane of Dumbreck, provost 
 1694–1702: Robert Cruickshank of Banchorie, provost  
 1702–07: John Allerdes, provost

References

See also
 List of constituencies in the Parliament of Scotland at the time of the Union

Burghs represented in the Parliament of Scotland (to 1707)
Constituencies disestablished in 1707
History of Aberdeenshire
Politics of the county of Aberdeen
1707 disestablishments in Scotland